Qwant is a French search engine, launched in February 2013 and operated from Paris. It is one of the few EU-based search engines. It claims that it does not employ user tracking or personalize search results in order to avoid trapping users in a filter bubble.

Qwant spread among its three main entry points: the normal homepage, a "light" version, and a "Qwant Junior" portal for children that filters results.

Qwant searches are powered by Bing. Qwant also confirmed the use of Bing advertising network.

As of May 2021, Qwant is the 105th most visited website in France and the 1415th most visited website in the world.

Search engine 
The search engine entered public beta on 16 February 2013, after two years of research and development. The first stable version was released on 4 July 2013. A new version was made available in April 2015.

In October 2015, Qwant released Qwant Lite, a lighter and faster version of Qwant.com that is aimed at being user-friendly for those with older browsers and others who do not have powerful or resource-rich computers. Integrated features such as video playback and JavaScript were removed and the on-site content was streamlined. The design of this version mimics that of Google's minimalist interface.

The child-friendly version was developed in cooperation with the French Ministry of Education.

According to its founder, Qwant does not want to compete with Google, but prefers "to show something different". Users can create a free account, which allows posting on the "boards", a feature with functions similar to those of a social bookmarking platform.

Earlier stand-out features, such as a knowledge graph (called the Qnowledge Graph) based on Wikipedia, seem to have been discontinued.

In July 2016, Mozilla signed a deal with Qwant to allow them to distribute an officially sanctioned version of the Firefox web browser with Qwant as the default search engine. Qwant has a web browser based on Firefox on the Apple App Store available for iOS.

When it was launched in 2017, the Brave web browser featured Qwant as one of its default search engines.

In 2018, the French government decreed that all government searches be made using Qwant.

In June 2019, Qwant launched Qwant Maps, an open source mapping service that uses the OpenStreetMap database to deliver privacy respecting maps and routing. It also unveiled Masq by Qwant, an open source technology that allows online services to offer personalized results from data securely stored on the user's device.

In March 2019, Google added Qwant to the Chrome default search list for French users.

in March 2022, Qwant filters Russian media websites from its search results.

Map 
Qwant launched a mapping service with data used from OpenStreetMap called Qwant Maps, in June 2019. The search engine for the mapping is Mimirsbrunn, vector rendering by Kartotherian and the highlighting of map data by Idunn.

Company 
The eponymous company behind the Qwant search engine was co-founded in February 2011 by Jean-Manuel Rozan, a financier; Éric Leandri, a specialist in computer security; and Patrick Constant, a search engine expert. It employs more than 160 people located in five French cities (Paris, Nice, Ajaccio, Rouen, and Épinal) and it has offices in Germany and Italy.

The company states that it makes money through commissions it receives when users visit advertised websites, such as eBay and Tripadvisor, from its search results.

From 2011 to 2014, Qwant acquired a total funding of €3.5 million, part of it as a loan. In 2014, it received additional funding, including a €6 million investment from Axel Springer Digital Ventures in return for a 20% stake in the company. In 2016 the European Investment Bank invested €25 million.

In 2021, Qwant took an 8 million Euro loan from Huawei. In 2024, the Chinese creditor could opt to take Qwant shares in lieu of payment for the loan amount.

In 2022, "Leandri was [...] convicted of illegally accessing the private electronic correspondence of his former business partner Rozan — his appeal is pending."

Privacy 
By virtue of being based in Europe, users gain some protection due to stringent European privacy laws. Qwant offers protections based on the new General Data Protection Regulation, which took effect in May 2018.

Qwant's Privacy Policy states that "as a principle, Qwant does not collect data about its users when they search". It claims not to use any cookie nor any other tracking technology.

Qwant seems to take numerous technical precautions to limit third parties from gaining insight into user search queries. For example, image-search results are made by routing images through Qwant servers, so that the websites serving the images are not informed of the user's identity.

In 2018 Qwant struck a deal with the privacy-centric on-screen keyboard provider Fleksy, in an attempt to create the most private search in any messenger application.

The website also states, in its privacy statement, that it resists French government surveillance:
 "Regarding the French law on intelligence passed on 24 June 2015, we found that the recommendations of the CNIL had gained very little currency: as a search engine, we emphatically do not endorse the measures adopted, especially as they are particularly intrusive from the point of view of individual privacy. Accordingly, we will make every effort to ensure the protection of our users' personal data."

Criticism 
Shortly after the release, some observers expressed doubts about the nature of Qwant. According to them, Qwant might not really be a search engine, but simply a website aggregating results of other search engines such as Bing and Amazon, and that the "Qnowledge Graph" is based on Wikipedia. The company has rejected the reports and asserts that they do have their own Web crawler and used other search engines in their primary developmental phase only for semantic indexing related purposes.

In June 2019, Qwant announced a partnership with Microsoft to use the Microsoft Azure cloud services to power its own crawlers and algorithms, while preserving the user's privacy. Microsoft said that Qwant "masters its technology, including its algorithm, its index and its client infrastructure, without collecting personal data, to better secure the respect for privacy of its users and the confidentiality of their searches".

The early versions of Qwant copied many design cues from Google.

Reception 

The New York Times drew a comparison of Qwant to Quaero, an earlier attempt to create a European search engine to rival Google that shut down in 2013 after investments of more than €250 million.

Several French newspapers and news sites discussed Qwant just after its beta launch in February 2013 and its final launch in July 2013.

 "Qwant.com – The new social search engine", en.kioskea.net
 "Qwant, le moteur de recherche à la française", france_info.fr 
 "Qwant : un moteur de recherche français pour concurrencer Google", pcinpact.com 
 "Qwant : moteur de recherche français à la sauce sociale", zdnet.fr 
 "Qwant : moteur de recherche made in France", génération-nt.com 
 "Qwant, le nouveau moteur de recherche français à l’assaut de Google, Bing et Yahoo ?!", lejournaldunumerique.com 
 "Qwant.com, challenger de Google", le_nouvel_economiste.fr 
 "Qwant, le moteur de recherche français, est lancé", futura-sciences.com 
 "Qwant, un nouveau moteur de recherche français qui parcourt les réseaux sociaux", l'expansion.l'express.fr 

The service received public support from Emmanuel Macron, then Minister of the Economy and Finance and the future President of France.

See also 
 Timeline of web search engines
 List of search engines
 Brave Search
DuckDuckGo
Startpage

References

External links

2013 establishments in France
Internet properties established in 2013
Internet search engines
French websites
Companies based in Paris
Multilingual websites